Ovzon AB is a broadband telecommunications company that offers mobile communication services via satellite. Ovzon has offices in Stockholm in Sweden and Florida in the United States.

History 
Ovzon was founded in 2006.

Future projects

Ovzon-3 satellite 
Ovzon is planning to procure and launch its own communications satellite Ovzon-3 with a mass of 1500 kg, which was announced on 16 October 2018. The original launch contract was attributed to SpaceX for a Falcon Heavy mission no earlier than the fourth quarter of 2020. The satellite would have been delivered directly into geostationary orbit. 

Ovzon announced 23 August 2019 that it had ended its agreement with SpaceX and would instead launch Ovzon-3 on an Arianespace Ariane 5 ECA launch vehicle in 2021. 

Delays in satellite manufacturing, by Feb 2023, shifted the launch back to SpaceX, with a planned launch on a Falcon 9 between July and September 2023.

References 

Telecommunications companies of Sweden
Companies based in Solna Municipality
Companies based in Florida